Malin Hållberg-Leuf (born 8 April 1979 in Örnsköldsvik) is a Swedish former competitive figure skater. She is the 2006 Swedish national champion.

Competitive highlights

References

External links
 
 Malin Hållberg-Leuf at Tracings.net

1979 births
Living people
People from Örnsköldsvik Municipality
Swedish female single skaters
Figure skaters at the 2007 Winter Universiade
Competitors at the 2001 Winter Universiade
Competitors at the 2003 Winter Universiade
Competitors at the 2005 Winter Universiade
Sportspeople from Västernorrland County
21st-century Swedish women